Ian Lynam (born 1970) is an Irish retired hurler who played as a goalkeeper for the Cork senior team.

Born in Blackpool, Cork, Lynam first arrived on the inter-county scene at the age of seventeen when he first linked up with the Cork minor team, before later joining the under-21 side. He made his senior debut during the 1994-95 National Hurling League. Lynam went on to play for Cork for just one championship season.

At club level Lynam is a one-time championship medallist with Glen Rovers.

In retirement from playing, Lynam became involved in team management and coaching. He has served as manager of the Glen Rovers senior team and is the current coach of the side.

Honours

Team

Glen Rovers
Cork Senior Hurling Championship (1): 1989

Cork
Munster Under-21 Hurling Championship (1): 1991 (sub)
Munster Minor Hurling Championship (1): 1988

References

1970 births
Living people
Glen Rovers hurlers
Cork inter-county hurlers
Hurling goalkeepers
Hurling managers